Cornelius Maurice Kennedy (10 June 1879 – 24 June 1950) was an Australian rules footballer who played with Essendon in the Victorian Football League (VFL).

Notes

External links 
		

1879 births
1950 deaths
Australian rules footballers from Victoria (Australia)
Essendon Football Club players